James Heywood or Haywood may refer to:

 Jamie Heywood (born 1966), American mechanical engineer who co-founded the ALS Therapy Development Institute
 James Heywood (philanthropist) (1810–1897), British MP, philanthropist and social reformer
 James Heywood (cricketer) (born 1982), English cricketer